Drygarn Fawr is a mountain in the county of Powys, Wales. It lies to the south of the Elan Valley Reservoirs. Rising above the remote moorland plateau of the Cambrian Mountains, and to the west of the peaks of Radnor Forest, the summit is topped by two distinctive, large cairns. The mountain has a gentle, grassy, conical shape with a few rocks near the summit. Nearby are the summits of Gorllwyn, Y Gamriw, and Drum yr Eira all over 600m.

Access
There are two paths to the summit. From Llannerch Yrfa, a bridleway winds up through forests in the Nant y Fedw valley before skirting the southern edge of the mountain.
 
An alternative route may be taken starting from Rhiwnant on the edge of the Caban Coch reservoir, one of the Elan Valley Reservoirs, and following the Nant Paradwys before turning off west towards the summit cairn. Both routes pass across wild moorland and peat bogs and the path may become difficult to follow and impassable, particularly after heavy rain.

External links
www.geograph.co.uk : photos of Drygarn Fawr and surrounding area

Elenydd
Mountains and hills of Powys
Hewitts of Wales
Marilyns of Wales
Nuttalls